"You Drive Me Crazy" is a 1981 single by Shakin' Stevens.

You Drive Me Crazy may also refer to:

 "(You Drive Me) Crazy", a 1999 song by Britney Spears
 "U Drive Me Crazy", a 1998 song by NSYNC song
 You Drive Me Crazy (TV series), a South Korean television drama

See also
 She Drives Me Crazy